Lidia Grychtołówna  (born 1928 in Rybnik) is a Polish pianist.

In 1955 she was awarded the V International Chopin Piano Competition's 7th prize, and one year later she shared the 3rd prize of the inaugural edition of the Robert Schumann Competition with Mikhail Voskresensky. She subsequently performed throughout the world, and held a professorship at the Johannes Gutenberg-Universität Mainz. She served as a juror at the Chopin Competition's X, XI and XIII editions.

Grychtołówna has been decorated the Gold Medal of the City of Milan.

References

External links
 Biography at The Fryderyk Chopin Institute in Warsaw.

Polish classical pianists
Polish women pianists
Polish music educators
Living people
1928 births
Prize-winners of the International Chopin Piano Competition
Alumni of the Academy of Music in Kraków
People from Rybnik
Women classical pianists